Vijay Kumar Yadav (born 15 April 1996) is an Indian judoka who competes in the 60 kg weight class. He won the bronze medal at the 2022 Commonwealth Games.

References

External links
 
 

Living people
1996 births
Indian male judoka
Indian male martial artists
Commonwealth Games bronze medallists for India
Commonwealth Games medallists in judo
Judoka at the 2022 Commonwealth Games
21st-century Indian people
Medallists at the 2022 Commonwealth Games